Saul B. Newton (June 25, 1906 – December 21, 1991) was a controversial psychotherapist who led an unorthodox therapy group in New York City. It had no formal name, but outsiders referred to members as "The Sullivanians".

Background
Newton's original family name was Cohen. He was born in Saint John, New Brunswick, and attended the University of Wisconsin.

Career
Newton went on to Chicago, where he associated with radical circles at the University of Chicago, becoming a communist and anti-fascist. He served with the Mackenzie–Papineau Battalion of the Abraham Lincoln Brigade in the Spanish Civil War (as Saul Bernard Cohen). and with the U.S. Army in World War II by draft in 1943. He went on to study psychotherapy after the war. Newton retained a dual focus on politics and psychology throughout his life.

In 1957, Newton and his wife, Dr. Jane Pearce, founded the Sullivan Institute for Research in Psychoanalysis in New York. They had previously worked at the William Alanson White Institute, but left several years after the death of Harry Stack Sullivan, one of the White Institute's founders. Although Newton and Pearce's institute was named after Sullivan, it was widely seen as offering a distorted version of Sullivan's teaching.

The Institute's teachings held that traditional family ties were the root cause of mental illness, and espoused a non-monogamous lifestyle. During the 1960s, an informal community centered on the therapeutic practices of the Institute began to form. (Judy Collins chronicles her time with the Sullivanians in her autobiography.). At its peak, in the late 1970s, this community had several hundred members (patients and therapists) living on the Upper West Side. The group gained some notoriety, not only for its non-monogamous lifestyle, but because patients were often encouraged to sever ties with their families.

A major project was the Fourth Wall Repertory Company (a.k.a. 'Fourth Wall Political Theater'), which performed from roughly 1976 to 1991. It was based in New York's East Village. Newton was a board member, and performed in several productions. Newton was also a producer of several documentaries directed by Joan Harvey, Newton's fifth wife, an actress and psychoanalyst.

Membership declined in the late 1980s when the group was subject to unfavorable publicity, investigations into alleged professional misconduct by its therapists, high-profile child custody cases (Paul Sprecher vs. Dee Dee Agee and Michael Bray vs. Alice Dobosh) and organized opposition by disaffected former members who described the group as a "psychotherapy cult".

Newton was married and divorced six times and had ten children, among them cultural anthropologist Esther Newton. He died in 1991 from sepsis, following the onset of Alzheimer's disease.

Works
 Conditions of Human Growth (with Jane Pearce). Citadel Press, 1986, .

References

Additional sources 
 Tamar Lewin, Custody Case Lifts Veil On a 'Psychotherapy Cult', NYT, June 3, 1988
 Ronald Sullivan,  Trial Involving Therapy Group Gets Under Way, NYT, April 4, 1989
 Bruce Lambert, Saul Newton, 85, Psychotherapist And Leader of Commune, Dies, NYT, December 23, 1991
 Abraham Lincoln Brigade, at Wikisource

Further reading
 Newton, Esther (2001), "A Hard Left Fist", in GLQ: A Journal of Lesbian and Gay Studies. 2001; 7: 111-130 (Biographical sketch)
 Siskind, Amy B. (2001), Child-Rearing Issues in Totalist Groups, in: Zablocki, Benjamin; Robbins, Thomas (eds.) (2001), Misunderstanding Cults: Searching for Objectivity in a Controversial Field, University of Toronto Press.
  Online-Review
 
 Cherney, Kaethe (2018) Happy as Larry: A New York Story of Cults, Crushes and Quaaludes, Nook Press, ISBN 978-1726658393.
 Graves, Alice (2019) Don't Tell Anyone: A Cult Memoir, Pond Park Press, ISBN 978-1689844529

1906 births
1991 deaths
American psychotherapists
Canadian psychotherapists
People from Saint John, New Brunswick
University of Wisconsin–Madison alumni
Canadian emigrants to the United States
American expatriates in Spain
United States Army personnel of World War II
Cult leaders
Abraham Lincoln Brigade members
American communists